John Helge Öberg (25 February 1906 – 21 February 1966) was a Swedish diver who won a silver medal in the 10 m platform at the 1926 European Championships. He competed in this event at the 1924 and 1928 Olympics and finished sixth in 1924.

References

1906 births
1966 deaths
Swedish male divers
Olympic divers of Sweden
Divers at the 1924 Summer Olympics
Divers at the 1928 Summer Olympics
Stockholms KK divers
Divers from Stockholm
20th-century Swedish people